Cornyn is a surname in English-language countries; it is from Ireland originally, and is the equivalent of Curneen.

Notable people sharing the surname Cornyn

 Alison Cornyn, American interdisciplinary artist
 John Cornyn (born 1952), United States Senator for Texas 
 Stan Cornyn (born 1933), American record label executive
 William Cornyn (1906–1971), Canadian-born American linguist

References